The Transfiguration Roman Catholic Church, also known as Church of the Transfiguration, is a Roman Catholic church at 64-14 Clinton Avenue in Maspeth, Queens, New York City. Belonging to the Roman Catholic Diocese of Brooklyn, its current pastor is Msgr. Joseph P. Calise. Prior to its merger with St. Stanislaus Kostka, it was established as a Lithuanian parish. 
It is now part of the merged Parish of Saint Stanislaus Kostka - Transfiguration.

History

Its parish was organized in 1908. 
Its first church building was erected in 1909 not on its current location but on Hull Avenue. The purpose of building it was to serve a community of Lithuanian immigrants who settled in Maspeth and the Blissville section of Long Island City. This original structure was destroyed by fire in 1925. The church was relocated to the former location of the old church building of St. Stanislaus Kostka Roman Catholic Church on Clinton Avenue, with its rear facade abutting Perry Avenue. St. Stanislaus Roman Catholic Church then moved to a new location on Maspeth Avenue and 61st Street. 

A new church building for the Transfiguration Roman Catholic Church was built in 1935. However, its present-day and modern-day looking structure was built in 1962. The 1935 structure of the building is now being used as a parish hall.

At present, the church's front lawn houses within its yard a replica of a Lithuanian roadside shrine. The church structure has a steeple that looks like the said shrine. A distinctive feature of the interior of the church building are decorations influenced by Lithuanian folk art. Above the doors of the church is a phrase in the Lithuanian language,  ("My house is a house of prayer"). A Mass is still held in the Lithuanian language once a month on the last Sunday of the month (except July and August). Its current pastor is Msgr. Joseph P. Calise.

See also
Saint Casimir, a Lithuanian saint
Holy Cross Roman Catholic Church (Maspeth, New York)
St. Adalbert Roman Catholic Church

References

External links

Official website of the Parish of Saint Stanislaus Kostka - Transfiguration

Roman Catholic churches in Queens, New York
Lithuanian-American culture in New York City
Maspeth, Queens